Silas Marner is a 1922 American silent historical drama film directed by Frank P. Donovan and starring Crauford Kent, Marguerite Courtot, and Robert Kenyon. It is an adaptation of the 1861 novel Silas Marner by George Eliot.

Plot
As described in a film magazine, at Lantern Yard Silas Marner (Kent) is accused of theft and is betrayed by his best friend, who is in love with the woman Silas is engaged to. He is driven from the town and goes to Raveloe where he becomes a hermit, piling up gold as a weaver. Over 15 years his faith in mankind and God are shaken, the only consolation is his pile of gold. One day this is stolen, and he becomes more of a recluse and even less friendly to his neighbors. A dying woman leaves a baby girl on his doorstep, bringing a change to his distorted view of life. Under her influence he becomes a respected citizen of the town. The girl's father, unknown to Silas, a son of the wealthy Squire Cass (Randolf), has been nursing the secret, pending his marriage to one of his set. After several years of marriage, the son confesses the duplicity to his wife, and they decide to claim the now young woman. Silas sees this as one more attempt to make him desolate. The young woman, however, would rather remain with Silas than go with her rightful father. She is later happily married to a suitor with whom Silas makes his home.

Cast
 Crauford Kent as Silas Marner 
 Marguerite Courtot as Sarah 
 Robert Kenyon as William Dane 
 Nona Marden as Sally Oates 
 Ricca Allen as Elina Tampscum 
 Austin Hume as Jem Rodney 
 Anders Randolf as Squire Cass 
 Bradley Barker as Godfrey Cass 
 Charles Coghlan as Dunsey Cass 
 Marie Wells as Nancy Lammeter 
 Alice Fleming as Dolly Winthrop 
 George Fawcett as Dr. Kimble 
 Helen Rowland as Eppie 
 Jean Girardin as Young Eppie 
 John Randall as Aaron

References

Bibliography
 Goble, Alan. The Complete Index to Literary Sources in Film. Walter de Gruyter, 1999.

External links

1922 films
Films directed by Frank P. Donovan
American silent feature films
American black-and-white films
Films set in England
Films based on British novels
Films set in the 1800s
1920s historical drama films
American historical drama films
1922 drama films
Associated Exhibitors films
1920s English-language films
1920s American films
Silent American drama films